İncirlikuyu is a village in Tarsus district of Mersin Province, Turkey. It is situated in Çukurova (Cilicia of the antiquity), to the south of Berdan Dam and to the north of Tarsus. The population of village was 564 as of 2012. Main economic activity is farming and especially grape production.

References

Villages in Tarsus District